The Bernier River is a tributary of the Saint-Maurice River, flowing on the north shore of the Saint Lawrence River, entirely in the municipality of Saint-Boniface, in the Maskinongé Regional County Municipality, in the administrative region of Mauricie, at Quebec, in Canada.

The course of the Bernier River generally descends to the southeast, in forest or agricultural areas. Its course passes between the village of Saint-Boniface and the city of Shawinigan.

The river surface is generally frozen from mid-December to the end of March. Safe traffic on the ice is generally from late December to early March. The water level of the river varies with the seasons and the precipitation.

Geography 
The Bernier River rises at the mouth of Lake Martel in Saint- Boniface. This source is located at:
  north of the village center of Saint-Boniface;
  north of the village center of Saint-Gérard-des-Laurentides;
  north-west of Shawinigan Bay.

  south-east in Saint-Boniface, to the [Canadian National] railway bridge;
  to the southeast, crossing the route 153 at the end of the segment, up to the bridge of the highway 55;
  south-east, collecting the waters from the confluence of the Blanche River, up to Bellevue road;
  northeasterly, to its confluence.

The Bernier River flows on the west bank of the Saint-Maurice River into Saint-Boniface downstream from Shawinigan Bay. The confluence of the Bernier River is located at:
  downstream from the confluence of the Shawinigan River which flows at the foot of the Shawinigan dam;
  east of the village center of Saint-Boniface;
  downstream of the railway bridge spanning the Saint-Maurice river upstream of the La Gabelle dam.

Toponymy 
The toponym Bernier river was formalized on March 6, 1975, at the Commission de toponymie du Québec.

References

Appendices

Related articles 
 Maskinongé Regional County Municipality
 Saint-Boniface, a municipality
 Blanche River, a stream
 Saint-Maurice River, a stream
 St. Lawrence River, a stream
 List of rivers in the Saint-Maurice basin
 List of rivers of Quebec

Rivers of Mauricie
Hydrological system of Saint-Maurice